Harold Augenbraum (born March 31, 1953) is an American writer, editor, and translator. He is the former Executive Director of the National Book Foundation, and former member of the Board of Trustees of the Asian American Writers Workshop, and former vice chair of the New York Council for the Humanities. Before taking up his position at the National Book Foundation in November 2004, for fifteen years Augenbraum was Director of The Mercantile Library of New York (now the Center for Fiction), where he established the Center for World Literature, the New York Festival of Mystery, the Clifton Fadiman Medal, and the Proust Society of America. He has been awarded eight grants from the National Endowment for the Humanities, received a Raven Award from the Mystery Writers of America for distinguished service to the mystery field, and coordinated the national celebration of the John Steinbeck Centennial. He is on the advisory board of the literary magazine The Common, based at Amherst College. In 2016, he was awarded an honorary doctorate from Concordia College in Moorhead, Minnesota. He is co-founder, with Alice Kaplan, of the Yale Translation Initiative at Yale University, where he is Associate Director, and from 2017 to 2019 was Acting Editor of The Yale Review.

Augenbraum has published six books on Latino literature of the United States. He has translated new editions of Alvar Núñez Cabeza de Vaca’s Chronicle of the Narváez Expedition, and Filipino novelist José Rizal’s Noli Me Tangere (1887) and El filibusterismo for Penguin Classics. He also edited the Collected Poems of Marcel Proust.

Books edited or translated

2013—Alvar Núñez Cabeza de Vaca, Narrative of the Narváez Expedition, edited
2013—Marcel Proust, Collected Poems, edited with an Introduction by
2012—Juan Rulfo, The Plain in Flames (El Llano en llamas), translated by Ilan Stavans and Harold Augenbraum
2011—José Rizal, El Filibusterismo, edited, translated, and with an Introduction by
2010 -- The Norton Anthology of Latino Literature, General Editor, Ilan Stavans, co- editor, Harold Augenbraum, et al.
2006 -- Lengua Fresca: Latinos on the Edge, edited with Ilan Stavans
2006—José Rizal, Noli Me Tángere (1887), translation
2005 -- Encyclopedia Latina, general editor, Ilan Stavans, associate editor, Harold Augenbraum.
2002—Alvar Núñez Cabeza de Vaca, Chronicle of the Narváez Expedition, revised translation
2002 -- How to Organize a Steinbeck Book or Film Discussion Group, with Susan Shillinglaw
2000 -- U.S. Latino Literature: A Critical Guide for Students and Teachers, edited with Margarite Fernandez-Olmos
1997 -- The Latino Reader: An American Literary Tradition from 1542 to the Present Day, edited with Margarite Fernandez-Olmos
1993 -- Growing Up Latino: Memoirs and Stories, with Ilan Stavans
1993 -- Bendíceme, América, with Terry Quinn and Ilan Stavans
1992 -- Latinos in English: A Selected Bibliography of Latino Fiction Writers of the United States, edited

References

 Contemporary Authors (Gale Research)
 Penguin Classics author biography

External links
 National Book Foundation
 

1953 births
Living people
American corporate directors
American book editors
American literary critics
American translators
American male non-fiction writers
Nonprofit chief executives